This is a list  of notable footballers who have played for Tottenham Hotspur since its foundation as Hotspur F.C. in 1882.

The list comprises those who have: -
 made 100 or more first-team appearances for the club including substitutions, and/or
 made 50 or more first-team and represented their country at full International level while on the club's books, and/or
 achieved notability through making a major contribution to the club as a player, e.g. club captain, founder member or achieved notability in other ways, e.g .

Records for some players vary from one data source to another and where possible these have been verified with reference to more than one such source. Corrections and updates should include a reference to source in the edit summary or on the Talk Page. To see a list of all Tottenham players, major or minor, with a Wikipedia article :Category:Tottenham Hotspur F.C. players.

List of players

Key

Players are listed according to the date of their first-team debut for the club.
First team appearances include, Football League, Premier League, FA Cup, League Cup, FA Community Shield, UEFA Champions League, UEFA Cup Winners' Cup, Inter-Cities Fairs Cup and UEFA Cup. Substitute appearances are included. Wartime matches are excluded.

International appearances are those at Full International level, including substitutions while on the club's books.

An asterisk (*) next to a name denotes that the player is still a current player at the club.

This is a list of notable players for Tottenham Hotspur. Please do not add the names and details of the current squad unless it meets the notability criteria above.

Table of notable players

 Players correct up to the 2022 January transfer window. Premier League and International statistics correct up to 13 May 2019

Club captains

Notes

References
Records and history of players on Tottenham Hotspur F.C. official site
Every player ever to play for Spurs in a competitive match on www.topspurs.com
Details of Honours, pen pictures of key players throughout the history of the club on www.mehstg.com
Appearances, caps transfers etc on Post War English & Scottish Football League A - Z Player's Database on www.neilbrown.newcastlefans.com/spurs/spurs.html
Statistics on players appearances for Club and National Team on Soccerbase.com 
National Team stats etc run by the Rec.Sport.Soccer Statistics Foundation
Records of Pre WW2 Welsh International Players on Welsh Football Data Archive
Records of all Scottish International Players on Scottish Football Association Archive
Record and Pen portraits for Northern Ireland International Players on Northern Ireland Football Greats
Record of all the English International Players on Englandstats.com
 Record of Icelandic International Players on Iceland National Football site
Russian National Team Results
Croatian National Team Results

Players
 
Tottenham Hotspur
Association football player non-biographical articles